John Chabot Smith (September 1, 1915 - May 16, 2002) was an American journalist and author, best known for his book: Alger Hiss: The True Story.

Personal life
Smith was born on September 1, 1915, in Croydon, UK. He attended the Loomis Institute. He majored in history at Princeton University. He did graduate studies at Cambridge University. In 1940, Smith married Betty McCarthy; they had two children. His wife passed away before him. Smith died age 86 on May 16, 2002, in Brooklyn, New York.

Career
Smith began his career as a journalist with the Washington Post. He joined the New York Herald Tribune as White House correspondent. Smith covered World War II overseas for the Herald-Trib. He covered the Hiss Case for the Herald Trib and later wrote a book about it, and about Hiss’s life in general. Three other journalists who covered the case also published books about it: Bert Andrews of Hearst, Ralph de Toledano of Newsweek, and Alistair Cooke of the Manchester Guardian. Hiss appeared with Smith at a press conference to promote the book, held at the Overseas Press Club. Leon Dennen called him a "pro-Tito correspondent."

Works
Of his book on Alger Hiss, Kirkus noted: "Don't expect bombshells. The hard evidence is slow in coming and can be bewilderingly technical when it come."  According to Allen Weinstein (whose book Perjury: The Hiss–Chambers Case, published in 1978, had different findings), "Smith adopted elements from a least six previous theories."  The Western Journal of Speech Communications assessed the book as "thoroughly sympathetic [to Hiss]."

Books
 Alger Hiss:  The True Story (1976)
 The Children of Master O'Rourke: An Irish Family Sage (1977)

Articles
 ”Woman Informer Against Reds Is Called by Thomas Committee" New York Herald Tribune (29 July 1948)
 "On Alger Hiss" New York Review of Books (25 November 1976)
 "The Debate of the Century" Harper's Magazine (June 1978)

See also
 Alger Hiss

References

1915 births
2002 deaths
American male journalists
New York Herald Tribune people
20th-century American journalists
21st-century American journalists
Loomis Chaffee School alumni